This is a list of books and films about Nicaragua.

Books

Non-fiction

Fiction

Films
Walker A film about William Walker, a 19th-century soldier of fortune and ruler of Nicaragua.
Under Fire A film about the last days of Somoza's rule. (Fictional story)
Back from Nicaragua A 1984 film by Julio Emilio Moliné featuring Joan Baez, Pete Seeger, and Holly Near.
Carla's Song A film about the Sandinistas-Contras conflict. (Fictional, but highly political)
 Nicaragua: A Nation's Right to Survive  A 1983 television documentary by John Pilger.
Nicaragua Was Our Home A documentary about repression of the Miskito Indians.
Pictures from a Revolution A 1991 documentary in which Susan Meiselas returns to Nicaragua to seek out the people and places she'd photographed there in 1979, during the revolution.
Que viva Mauricio Demierre/Y también la revolucion A 2006 documentary by Stéphane Goël about a Swiss cooperant who was murdered by the contras during the revolution.
Last Plane Out 1983 film about the last days of Somoza's rule.
The Mosquito Coast by Peter Weir
Sandino (1990) by Miguel Littín
Kill the Messenger (2014 film) by Michael Cuesta
From the Ashes: Nicaragua Today by Helena Solberg

See also 

 Bibliography of Nicaragua
 List of Nicaraguan films

References

Films and books
Works about Nicaragua